See:
Blue-eyed soul (also known as white soul), is a slang music industry term for rhythm and blues and soul music performed by white artists.
Brown-eyed soul, soul music created and performed in the United States mainly by Latinos in Southern California during the 1960s, continuing through to the early 1980s.